A destroyer is a type of warship.

Destroyer may also refer to:

Arts and entertainment

Characters
Destroyer (comics), several characters from DC and Marvel Comics, including:
Destroyer (Marvel Comics), three superheroes
Destroyer (Thor), an Asgardian weapon in Marvel Comics
Alex Power or Destroyer, a member of the Marvel Comics team Power Pack
Jack Power (Marvel Comics) or Destroyer, a member of the Marvel Comics team Power Pack
Destoroyah, or Destroyer, a Godzilla villain
Destroyer, a massive golem from The Legend of Spyro: Dawn of the Dragon
Destroyers, the main antagonists in the expansion pack Guild Wars: Eye of the North
The Destroyer, the main antagonist in Darksiders

Film and television
Destroyer (1943 film), an American black-and-white war film
Destroyer (1988 film), an American horror film
Destroyer (2018 film), an American crime film
"Destroyer" (Justice League Unlimited), a television episode

Games
Destroyer (arcade game), a 1977 naval combat game by Atari
Destroyer (video game), a 1986 naval combat game by Epyx
Destroyer (dice game) or Ship, captain, and crew, a drinking game

Literature
The Destroyer (novel series), an action-adventure novel series by Warren Murphy and Richard Sapir
Destroyer, a 2005 novel in the Foreigner series by C. J. Cherryh
The Destroyers, a 1974 novel by Douglas Reeman
The Destroyers (novel), a 2017 novel by Christopher Bollen
Destroyer Magazine, a Swedish English-language gay magazine

Music
Ibanez Destroyer, an electric guitar

Performers
Destroyer (band), a Canadian rock band fronted by Daniel Bejar
The Destroyers, George Thorogood's band

Albums
Destroyer (Black Mountain album), 2019
Destroyer (Gorgoroth album) or the title song, 1998
Destroyer (Kiss album), 1976
Destroyer (Led Zeppelin bootleg recording), 1977
The Destroyer (Alec Empire album), 1996
The Destroyer (Part 1), by TR/ST, 2019
The Destroyer (Part 2), by TR/ST, or the title song, 2019

Songs
"Destroyer" (The Kinks song), 1981
"Destroyer" (Static-X song), 2007
"Destroyer", by Design the Skyline from Nevaeh, 2011
"Destroyer", by Parkway Drive from Ire, 2015
"Destroyer", by Phantogram from Three, 2016
"Destroyer", by Saint Motel from Saintmotelevision, 2016
"Destroyer", by Twisted Sister from Under the Blade, 1982

People
Dick Beyer (1930–2019), ringname The Destroyer, American professional wrestler
Rudy Distrito (born 1958), nickname The Destroyer, Filipino basketball player

Religion
Destroying angel (Bible), also known as "The Destroyer"
Shiva the Destroyer, of Hindu tradition

Sports
Club Destroyers, a football club from Santa Cruz, Bolivia
Columbus Destroyers, an Arena Football League team from Columbus, Ohio, US, 1999–2008 and 2019
FC JAX Destroyers, a soccer team from Jacksonville, Florida, US, 2010–2012
Mid-Michigan Destroyers, a Premier Basketball League team from Bay City, Michigan, US, 2009
Virginia Destroyers, a United Football League team from Virginia Beach, Virginia, US, 2009–2012

Weaponry
Destroyer carbine, a Spanish rifle
Douglas B-66 Destroyer, a US Air Force light bomber
Douglas BTD Destroyer, a US Navy torpedo bomber
Heavy fighter or Zerstörer (lit. Destroyer), a class of 1930s and 1940s German combat aircraft
Gaztanaga Destroyer, a Spanish pistol

See also